The Mexican Lucha libre, or professional wrestling promotion The Crash Lucha Libre (The Crash) has produced and scripted a number of wrestling shows since their creation in November 2011.. Some of these shows have become annual events, some are special one-off events, normally indicated by a special main event match or being promoted under a special name, and some are The Crash's normally promoted shows. Many of the annual and special events are headlined by a Lucha de Apuestas, or "bet match", where a wrestler will put his wrestling mask or hair on the line. The group holds their Anniversary show each year in November and will on occasion co-promote a show with other promotions such as Major League Wrestling, Fight Club: Pro or Revolucha. The majority of the shows are held in Tijuana, Baja California, Mexico at the Auditorio Fausto Gutierrez.

The Crash Lucha Libre shows

References

Professional wrestling-related lists
The Crash Lucha Libre shows